The 1996 Jordanian  League (known as The Jordanian  League,   was the 46th season of Jordan League since its inception in 1944. Al-Wehdat won its 6th title after winning the playoff game against Al-Faisaly 1-1 (4-2 Penalties) .

Teams

Map

League table 

</onlyinclude>

Championship playoff
Because the top two teams finished with the same number of points, a championship playoff was played to determine the champions of Jordan for 1996 season.

Overview
It was contested by 10 teams, and Al-Wehdat won the championship.

References
Jordan - List of final tables (RSSSF)

{{|source=rsssf.com
}}

Jordanian Pro League seasons
Jordan
football
football